Henry Stone  is an Australian comedian, writer, and director.

Career
Originating from Brisbane, Queensland, Stone began performing live comedy in his home town in 2009, the same year he also formed sketch comedy group, Skills in Time, with friends Greg Larsen and Sam Campbell. In 2015 Skills in Time produced a pilot for SBS Television, titled Looking Back.

In 2011, as a stand-up comedian Stone performed as part of the Melbourne International Comedy Festival's "Comedy Zone", alongside Luke Heggie, Jennifer Wong, Ronny Chieng and Daniel Connell. In 2014 Stone and his new sketch group, Fancy Boy, wrote and performed Variety Show which went on to win the Golden Gibbo award at the Melbourne International Comedy Festival.

In 2016, Fancy Boy were commissioned to create a TV sketch show for ABC TV and Seeso.

Stone commenced work as a screenwriter and director for his online-produced material, including the web series Dirty Bird, and moved into short film and television work for various programs on the ABC, SBS, Comedy Central, Seeso, Channel 10 & Adult Swim.

Awards and nominations 
2014: Winner, Melbourne International Comedy Festival Golden Gibbo Award – Fancy Boy Variety Show
2017: Winner, AWG Award for Best Sketch Comedy 2017 – Fancy Boy
2019: Nominated, Australian Directors' Guild Award for Best Online Comedy Direction – Be Your Own Boss

Filmography
Dirty Bird (Series) – 2014
Fully Furnished (Series) – 2014
Ad Nauseam (Feature Film)- 2014
Crazy Bastards (Series) – 2014
Heidi Fires Everyone (Short) – 2014
Looking Back (Series) – 2015
The Tail Job (Feature Film) – 2015
Fancy Boy (TV Series) – 2016
Wham Bam Thank You Ma'am (TV Series) – 2016
The Letdown (TV Series) – 2016
1800 Success (Series) - 2017
No Experience Necessary (Series) - 2017
The Checkout (Series)
Tonightly With Tom Ballard (Series) - 2018
Celebrity Name Game (TV series) – 2019
At Home Alone Together (TV Series) - 2020
A Life In Questions: Wisdom School, with Aaron Chen (special) - 2020

References

External links
 
 

Living people
1988 births
Australian sketch comedians
Australian stand-up comedians
People from Queensland
Male actors from Queensland